This is the solo and group discography of hip hop collective Monsta Island Czars. Included are the solo studio albums, EPs and compilations of the various group members and affiliates.

Group discography

Solo discography

Solo EPs

Compilations

Mixtapes

Bootlegs/Unauthorized Albums

Monsta Island Czars